The Magic Door is the second studio album by American blues rock band Chris Robinson Brotherhood, released on September 11, 2012. It was recorded at the same time as the band's previous album, Big Moon Ritual, and features a cover of Hank Ballard's "Let's Go, Let's Go, Let's Go," a song the band frequently performed live. "Appaloosa" and "Little Lizzie Mae" are versions of recent Black Crowes songs (from Before the Frost...Until the Freeze and Cabin Fever, respectively), and "Someday Past the Sunset" was previously released on the Robinson brothers' live album, Brothers of a Feather: Live at the Roxy.

Track listing
All songs by Chris Robinson, except where noted.

Personnel
Chris Robinson Brotherhood
Chris Robinson – lead vocals, guitar
Neal Casal – guitar, vocals
Adam MacDougall – keyboards, vocals
Mark Dutton – bass, vocals
George Sluppick – drums

Others
Amy Finkle – featured artist
Thom Monahan – engineer, mixing, production
Nicolas Essig – assistant engineer
Geoff Neal – assistant engineer
Alan Forbes – artwork

References

2012 albums
Chris Robinson Brotherhood albums
Albums produced by Thom Monahan